Sanjeevaiah Park railway station is a railway station in Hyderabad, Telangana, India. It is located adjacent to the Sanjeevaiah Park that is on the banks of the Hussain Sagar lake.

Lines
Multi-Modal Transport System, Hyderabad
Secunderabad–Falaknuma route (FS Line)

External links
MMTS Timings as per South Central Railway

MMTS stations in Hyderabad